The M-4.1 Road, sometimes known as the old R-5 regional road, was a Montenegrin roadway. It was longer and better maintained then the old M-4 road. In January 2016, the Montenegrin road system changed and the M4.1 doesn't exist anymore.

References

Highways in Montenegro